The following is a list of current National Lacrosse League (NLL) team rosters. Each National Lacrosse League team may carry twenty-three players on their active roster.  In addition, teams may keep two players on their practice team.  Also, teams may place players on a number of restricted lists, such as "injured reserve," "unable to play," "hold out," and "protected." 

For each game, teams are allowed to dress a total of eighteen players.  This must include two goaltenders and sixteen runners.

Rosters are filled by a combination of drafts, free agency, and trades.  Each year, the league holds an entry draft with players who are 21 years of age, or if less than 21 years of age, has used or given up all NCAA or NAIA eligibility.  Also, in years in which a new team is introduced the league holds an expansion draft, or in some years in which a team is ceasing operations a dispersal draft is held.  

The league has an annual trade deadline, which typically falls right before the final month of the season. After this deadline no players exchanged may join the new team on its playoff roster.  

There are two difference types of free agency in the National Lacrosse League, restricted and unrestricted.  In order to qualify for restricted free agency players must have played in the league for three seasons and participated in twenty-three regular season games.  A restricted free agent's club may sign the player to a qualifying offer prior to the deadline, or match any offer made by any other club after the deadline in order to retain the players services.  An unrestricted free agent (‡) is any player who has reached thirty-two years of age and has played six seasons in the league.  An unrestricted free agent may be "franchised" by their club.  A franchise player (†), limited to two per club, earns an automatic twenty-percent above the league's maximum salary. If an unrestricted free agent is not franchised, then he may sign with any team in the league.

Eastern Division

Buffalo Bandits

Georgia Swarm

New England Black Wolves

Philadelphia Wings

Rochester Knighthawks

Toronto Rock

Western Division

Calgary Roughnecks

Colorado Mammoth

San Diego Seals

Saskatchewan Rush

Vancouver Warriors

References

 Rosters
Rosters